Ghosted is an upcoming American romantic comedy action-adventure film directed by Dexter Fletcher and written by Rhett Reese, Paul Wernick, Chris McKenna, and Erik Sommers, from a story by Reese and Wernick. The film stars Chris Evans and Ana de Armas. Produced by Apple Studios and Skydance Media, it is set to be released by Apple TV+ on April 21, 2023.

Cast
 Chris Evans as Cole Riggan
 Ana de Armas as Sadie
 Adrien Brody as Leveque
 Mike Moh as Wagner
 Tim Blake Nelson as Borislov
 Marwan Kenzari as Marco
 Anna Deavere Smith as Claudia Yates
 Lizze Broadway as Mattie
 Mustafa Shakir as Monte Jackson
 Tiya Sircar as Patti
 Amy Sedaris
 Tate Donovan
 Scott Vogel
 Burn Gorman
 Fahim Fazli
 Marisol Correa
 Gina Jun
 Victoria Kelleher
 Sasha Go
 Bailey MB
 Daniel Eghan

Production
In August 2021, Chris Evans and Scarlett Johansson entered negotiations to star in Ghosted, a film pitched by screenwriters Paul Wernick and Rhett Reese to Skydance Media, with Dexter Fletcher attached to direct. In December 2021, Johansson had to exit the film due to a scheduling conflict, leading to Ana de Armas being cast in her place. In February 2022, Adrien Brody joined the cast. Mike Moh, Amy Sedaris, Tim Blake Nelson, and Tate Donovan would be added in March.

Principal photography took place from February to May 2022 in Atlanta and Washington D.C..

Release
The film is scheduled to be released on Apple TV+ on April 21, 2023.

References

External links
 Ghosted on Apple TV+
 

Upcoming films
2023 films
American action adventure films
American romantic action films
Apple TV+ original films
Films directed by Dexter Fletcher
Films shot in Atlanta
Films shot in Washington, D.C.
Films with screenplays by Rhett Reese
Films with screenplays by Paul Wernick
Skydance Media films
Upcoming English-language films